Romeo.Juliet is a 1990 film-in-concert adaptation of William Shakespeare's tragedy Romeo and Juliet.  The motion picture is an original creation by American director, producer, writer and cinematographer Armando Acosta (also credited as Armondo Linus Acosta and Armand Acosta). With a cast of feral cats from Venice, New York City, Verona and Ghent, the dialogue is vocalized by award-winning British film and theater talent. The soundtrack features Sergei Prokofiev's Romeo and Juliet ballet music.

Plot
'La Dame aux Chats,' the only human character in Romeo.Juliet, is an eccentric Venetian bag lady who lives with her pet rat on a houseboat named Fellini. She saves the lives of Juliet (a magnificent cloud-white Turkish Angora) and her feline family by smuggling them onto a ship bound for the New World.  Soon after arriving in the docks of New York, Juliet meets her Romeo – a smokey long-haired gray feral.

Inspiration
While working in Hollywood in the early 1960s, Acosta observed feral cats who made their home on the backlot of Paramount Pictures. Fascinated by their habits, patterns and innate, meditative nature, he wanted to film cats in their own environment and edit the footage to music.

It was not until 1964, armed with an Arriflex camera that Acosta began filming the street cats of New York City. Wanting to capture the authentic choreographic movements, grace, and elegance of cats, he used slow-motion techniques that were available at that time.

Acosta wanted to add to the footage and soundtrack, the essence of the classic story of starry-eyed lovers – not just Shakespeare's version, or the Leonard Bernstein, Stephen Sondheim, Arthur Laurents, Jerome Robbins adaptation, but the ancient tale of Layla and Majnun.

According to Acosta, "These stories suggest a hidden truth that the highest love is beyond the body. Cat lovers, animal lovers understand this 'higher love' – a love of devotion, responsibility and respect."

In 1964, neither the technology nor the finances were readily available for Acosta to seriously pursue his dream.

It took almost 25 years before Acosta would be able to put together all the necessary ingredients – the most important being technology – to create as director, producer, cinematographer and writer his first full-length motion picture.

Script
An original screenplay containing what Acosta describes as "carefully chosen Shakespearean nuggets of gold" was written by Koen Vanbrabant with Acosta. British actor and theater personality Victor Spinetti served as the script consultant.

Cast
 Romeo            – Robert Powell 
 Juliet           – Francesca Annis
 Mother Capulet   – Vanessa Redgrave CBE  
 Father Capulet   – Sir Ben Kingsley 
 Mercutio         – Sir John Hurt
 Rozaline         – Dame Maggie Smith 
 Tybalt           – Victor Spinetti
 Benvolio         – Quentin Crisp
 Prince           – John Haggart
 Friar Lawrence   – Theo Cowan

La Dame aux Chats
'La Dame aux Chats' is performed in a cameo appearance by British actor, John Hurt. When interviewed by the BBC Hurt explained, "...and he needed a cat lady who lives on a barge who collects the cats of Venice together and takes them to the New World where the story begins. A cat lady, a bag lady in fact, who lives on a barge and I'm the only human being in it"

When Hurt was asked why he accepted the strange role of a Venetian bag lady, he replied, “I’m sort of used to transformations, that’s my living. But I haven’t very often gone this far. Hurt also explained, "The whole idea is unique as far as I know. I've never heard of such a thing, and I thought indeed, it would make a fascinating film." Later he jokingly added, "It's very much a supporting role."

Acosta explained, "I wanted 'La Dame' to have that neutral quality, this sort of male-female never knowing quality. John was not only an actor of great ingenuity and power of invention, he understood transformation."

Music
The soundtrack features Serge Prokofiev's ballet music Romeo and Juliet performed by the London Symphony Orchestra and conducted by André Previn. Acosta chose Previn for his 'swan-like' conductor's quality. In fact, Previn's interpretation of the Prokofiev score runs 7-10% slower than most other recorded performances.

The original Romeo.Juliet Theme, composed by Emanuel Vardi and Armando Acosta, is performed by the London Symphony Orchestra, conducted by Barry Wordsworth.

Locations
The film was shot on location in Ghent, Manhattan, Coney Island, Venice and Santa Monica with many interiors filmed in the huge Roncalli Circus warehouse in Cologne.

Technical
Romeo.Juliet is the first full-length motion picture to be filmed exclusively on video and successfully transferred onto 35mm.

To allow the natural choreography and movement of the cats to be synchronized with the soundtrack, 99% of the film was shot in digital slow motion.

Over 400 feet of video footage was shot with an editing process that took over 4000 hours.

Romeo.Juliet has been acknowledged as a pioneering technical achievement by Academy Award winning cinematographer, Linwood Dunn and other motion picture specialists.

World premiere
The World Premiere was held on September 6, 1990 at the 47th Venice International Film Festival. The late festival director, Guglielmo Biraghi, a cat lover and colleague of Acosta, invited the film to be screened out of competition.

Film critics and journalists across Europe covered the World Premiere of Romeo.Juliet.

Henri Chapier from the French television network, Antenne 2, reported, "A baroque film of art almost crazy with an enormous budget, Romeo.Juliet by Armando Acosta tells Shakespeare's play through the confrontation of two rival tribes of cats. A sophisticated achievement, full of originalities, the film enchants even those that refuse to be dazzled."

Isabella Stasi of BBC Channel Four reported, "Away from the awards, among the 32 films at Venice there have been the good, the bad and the bizarre. The most extraordinary is Romeo.Juliet."

The Sunday Times wrote, "The strangest film on show was Romeo.Juliet, directed by Armando Acosta, in which Prokofiev's music and the voices of Robert Powell, Ben Kingsley, Vanessa Redgrave and Maggie Smith are accompanied by onscreen performances delivered by cats, photographed sumptuously in Venice, Ghent and Coney Island. John Hurt as a sort of Venetian bag lady is the only human to be seen."

Additional screenings
Romeo.Juliet was screened at the 1990 Flanders International Film Festival Ghent and the 1990 Cologne Film Festival.

In January 1992, the film was screened in Los Angeles at the Directors Guild Theater, Writers Guild Theater and at Warner Bros. studio.

In June 1994, Romeo.Juliet returned to Venice for three screenings, upon an invitation, by Ms. Constanza Farinelli, organizer of the Cat Congress and Symposium.

Film concerts
The motion picture was conceived and created as a film-in-concert with a live orchestra performing the soundtrack with the projection of the movie. The Romeo.Juliet Film-in-Concert World Premiere was held at the Palais des Beaux Arts Centre for Fine Arts, Brussels in June 1992.

British-born conductor Nicholas Cleobury led the National Orchestra of Belgium in three performances.  Upon an invitation by Armando Acosta,  John Hurt and Oleg Prokofiev, son of the composer, Serge Prokofiev attended the premiere.

Oleg Prokovfiev stated in an interview, "...it's not simply a film, it's a poem.  It's a higher art than cinema, it's super cinema.  A special cinema which does not follow a classical story line, but harmoniously blends my father's ballet music, Shakespeare's text and the magical images of the film."

In February 1993, a second series of sold-out film concert performances was held in Tokyo at the NHK Hall. Yoko Matsuo conducted the New Japan Philharmonic Orchestra with Armondo Linus Acosta in attendance.

References

 Andrew, Geoff. "John Hurt interviewed by Geoff Andrew", The Guardian Unlimited
 Romeo.Juliet on Yahoo! Movies

External links 

 
 
 
 Vimeo Romeo.Juliet Trailer https://vimeo.com/116844501
 Vimeo Romeo.Juliet Presentation Trailer https://vimeo.com/88595328
 Vimeo Romeo.Juliet Film Concert Trailer https://vimeo.com/88595327

1990 films
Belgian musical films
Films about cats
Films based on Romeo and Juliet
1990s English-language films